Silvia Sabine Rieger (born 14 November 1970) is a retired German athlete who specialized in the 400 metres hurdles.

Her personal best time in the 400 metres is 54.22 seconds, achieved at the 1998 IAAF World Cup in Johannesburg. This places her sixth on the German all-time list, behind Sabine Busch, Cornelia Ullrich, Ellen Fiedler, Heike Meissner and Gudrun Abt.

She competed at the 1992 Summer Olympics and the 1996 Summer Olympics.

Achievements

References

External links
 
 
 

1970 births
Living people
German female hurdlers
Athletes (track and field) at the 1992 Summer Olympics
Athletes (track and field) at the 1996 Summer Olympics
Olympic athletes of Germany
European Athletics Championships medalists